The Big Bird Cage is a 1972 American exploitation film of the "women in prison" subgenre. It serves as a non-sequel follow-up to the 1971 film The Big Doll House. The film was written and directed by Jack Hill, and stars Pam Grier, Sid Haig, Anitra Ford, and Carol Speed.

Plot
Blossom (Pam Grier), a buxom bad girl, is the rough-and-ready girlfriend of a radical guerrilla leader, Django (Sid Haig). She keeps her relationship a secret, but is also quick to start a fight without knowing it. However, when Django's mercenary friends itch for some female companionship, she softens and the two devise a plan to liberate the inmates of a local women's prison, where the inmates are kept barefoot and subjected to brutally hard labor. A woman named Terry (Anitra Ford), a social climber, ends up in the prison herself because of Blossom and Django's earlier robbery. She is now forced to deal with crazy inmates, gay guards, and torture of the cage. Terry, Blossom, and Django (who busted in by seducing Rocco, one of the guards) eventually come together to face off against the warden Zappa (Andrés Centenera) to stage an explosive breakout.

Cast
Pam Grier as Blossom
Sid Haig as Django
Anitra Ford as Terry
Candice Roman as Carla
Teda Bracci as Bull Jones
Carol Speed as Mickie
Karen McKevic as Karen
Marissa Delgado as Rina
Vic Diaz as Rocco
Andres Centenera as Zappa
Zenaida Amador as Prison Doctor

See also
 List of American films of 1972

References

External links
 
 

1972 films
1970s exploitation films
American prison films
Philippine drama films
1970s English-language films
Women in prison films
Films directed by Jack Hill
New World Pictures films
Films shot in the Philippines
American exploitation films
1970s American films